Union of Professional Wrestling Force International, better known as UWF International, U-Inter, or simply UWFi, was a shoot style professional wrestling promotion in Japan from 1991 to 1996. The UWF international was the successor to the Newborn UWF that ran from 1988 to 1990, which itself was the successor to the original Universal Wrestling Federation. 

Although the matches were predetermined, the UWF-i was very convincing for its time, promoting a combat-based style featuring a mix of wrestling, submission grappling and kickboxing. The promotion also held kickboxing contests and, in rare instances, special shoot matches. In retrospect, UWFi, along with other shoot-style promotions, served as a precursor to mixed martial arts and to popular Japanese MMA promotions, particularly Pride FC. The promotion was also known for hiring dangerous shooters Lou Thesz, Billy Robinson and Danny Hodge as trainers and promoters of their product in order to establish legitimate credibility.

History
The promotion was founded on May 10, 1991, as a continuation of the UWF. The UWF-i featured most of UWF's roster, and was led by Nobuhiko Takada, who was the top star and the face of the promotion. Other natives for the promotion included Kazuo Yamazaki, Yoji Anjo, Kiyoshi Tamura, Tatsuo Nakano, Yuko Miyato, Masahito Kakihara and kickboxer Makoto Oe. Vintage shooter Billy Robinson was used as head trainer for their gym (the UWFi Snakepit), and wrestling legends Lou Thesz and Danny Hodge occasionally served as trainers in their pursuit of old-school credibility. Former pro wrestler Shinji Sasazaki would lend a hand by helping some of the foreign talent, mostly from the Tennessee area, get booked on their cards.

In 1992, the UWFi introduced its first championship, the "Real Pro-Wrestling World Heavyweight Championship", which was won by Takada after a victory over top foreign antagonist Gary Albright. Lou Thesz acted as commissioner and lent his 1950s NWA World title belt to be used as the distinction for it. The theme of UWFi being "real pro-wrestling" was central to the promotion's image, and both Thesz and Takada would deride other Japanese promotions (particularly Takada's old promotion New Japan Pro-Wrestling) for being "fake", while claiming themselves to be legit. UWF-i, however, was no more legit than any other group at the time. Takada went so far as to challenge the champions of other major Japanese promotions (Mitsuharu Misawa (AJPW Triple Crown Champion at the time), Masahiro Chono (NWA World Heavyweight Champion at the time), and The Great Muta (IWGP Heavyweight Champion at the time), in an effort to determine who was the true world champion.

In 1993, Super Vader, the World Heavyweight Champion from the United States-based World Championship Wrestling, accepted Thesz and Takada's grandstand challenge, whereas the aforementioned champions were "too afraid" of Takada to face him. After Gary Albright quit UWFi to join All Japan and Vader left over money disputes, the promotion was left with a lack of credible challengers to Takada's title, and interest in the promotion began to wane. After being overlooked several times over the years, Kazuo Yamazaki left to return to New Japan in July 1995.

Feud with New Japan Pro-Wrestling
In 1995, Anjo and other UWFi bookers proposed co-promoting with New Japan Pro-Wrestling, as a potential solution to their financial problems. New Japan booker Riki Choshu agreed, under the condition that New Japan have full control over the booking of the interpromotional matches. Thesz, who saw New Japan as another gimmicky promotion, withdrew his support as a result and took the belt with him. For Choshu, it was an opportunity to get payback for Thesz and Takada's earlier derision of their wrestling style, and he was determined to show fans that the real stars were in New Japan. All of UWFi's stars mainly lost the interpromotional matches, with the exception of Takada, who won the IWGP Heavyweight Championship on January 4, 1996. Kiyoshi Tamura had left UWFi before the feud in 1995, to join rival promotion, RINGS.

In 1996, as the New Japan feud died down, UWFi formed an alliance with Genichiro Tenryu's WAR.
 
On August 17, 1996, Takada defeated Yoji Anjo at Tokyo's Meiji-Jingu Stadium.
The damage to the promotion's credibility had already been done, however, and UWFi had its farewell card ("UWF FINAL") on December 27, 1996, at Tokyo's Korakuen Hall arena. Most of the UWFi roster formed Kingdom, which would promote a similar product on a smaller scale. Kingdom would  have a presence at UFC Japan: Ultimate Japan in 1997, as Yoji Anjo would lose to Tank Abbott, while Kazushi Sakuraba won the heavyweight tournament.

Rules

The combatants would start with 15 points each. Points would be lost for knockout attempts, being at a disadvantage during a hold, and/or for breaking a hold by grabbing onto the ring ropes with hand(s) and/or feet. The only way to win was by submission, knockout (count of 10) or a wrestler's points being reduced to 0.

Tag team matches were allowed as well, with 21 points (instead of 15) given to a team at start time. However, the points system was rarely referred to, as a wrestler or team losing points could still win by forcing his opponent to submit or by knocking him out. No pinfall counts were allowed, and no countouts were allowed (in practice, wrestlers never set foot outside the ring during the match). Similarly, six-man tag team matches occurred, but were rare, with 30 points given to a team at start time.

In 1995, rules were somewhat relaxed to allow pinfalls in order to allow for New Japan, WAR, and other non-submission-oriented wrestlers (such as Abdullah the Butcher) to compete.

Roster

Natives:
 Nobuhiko Takada
 Kazuo Yamazaki
 Naoki Sano
 Kazushi Sakuraba
 Yoshihiro Takayama
 Koji Kitao
 Masahito Kakihara
 Yoji Anjoh
 Tatsuo Nakano
 Hiromitsu Kanehara
 Kenichi Yamamoto
 Yuko Miyato
 Masakazu Maeda
 Kiyoshi Tamura
 Makoto Oe (kickboxer)

Foreigners:
 Super Vader
 Gary Albright
 Dan Severn
 Mark Fleming 
 Victor Zangiev
 Salman Hashimikov
 Vladimir Berkovitch
 The Iron Sheik
 Bob Backlund
 Gene Lydick
 J. T. Southern
 James Stone
 Bad News Allen
 Tom Burton
 Steve Nelson
 Mark Silver
 Billy Scott
 Dennis Koslowski
 Tommy Cairo
 Steve Cox
 Greg Bobchick
 Pez Whatley
 Jim Boss
 Matthew Saad Muhammad
 Bowy Chowaikun (kickboxer)
 Danny Steel (kickboxer)
 Norman Smiley

Championships

Pro-Wrestling World Heavyweight Championship
The championship used the belt used by Lou Thesz as NWA World Champion during the 1950s.

Combined reigns

Video game
In 1995, Hudson Soft published a video game, Saikyō: Takada Nobuhiko (最強～高田延彦～) for the Super Famicom in Japan. Unlike most wrestling games, Saikyō was a linear fighting game, but moves such as suplexes counted for heavy scoring, like in the real-life promotion. Nobuhiko Takada was the only actual wrestler licensed as a character, all others used made-up pseudonyms made through alterations of their kana or kanji names, such as Gary Albright being known as Gary Briant.

See also

Professional wrestling in Japan

References

External links
 http://www.UWF-Bushido.com
 http://UWFiTeam.com
 http://uwfi.forum24.ru
 http://uwfi.borda.ru

Entertainment companies established in 1991
Entertainment companies disestablished in 1996
1991 establishments in Japan
1996 disestablishments in Japan
Japanese professional wrestling promotions